The opening ceremony of the 2018 Winter Olympics was held at the Pyeongchang Olympic Stadium in Pyeongchang, South Korea on 9 February 2018. It began at 20:00 KST and finished at approximately 22:20 KST. The Games were officially opened by President of the Republic of Korea Moon Jae-in.

Preparations
The site of the opening ceremony, Pyeongchang Olympic Stadium, was built specifically for the Games. The pentagonal stadium seated 35,000. The organizers for the event said the shape was chosen because it is a combination of different shapes, a circle, a square, and a triangle, which represent heaven, earth, and mankind. No Olympic or Paralympic events were be held at the stadium, which was only used for the opening and closing ceremonies. The venue was torn down afterwards.

The broadcast of the Opening Ceremony of the 2018 Winter Olympic Games was available in more than 200 countries around the world. 
Ha Hyun-woo of the band Guckkasten, Ahn Ji-young of the musical duo Bolbbalgan4, Lee Eun-mi and Jeon In-kwon with his band Deulgukhwa performed and sang John Lennon's "Imagine" at the opening ceremony.
The Rainbow Children's Choir performed an arrangement, with Korean traditional musical instruments, of the national anthem, “Aegukga”. The multiethnic children's choir was formed to educate the Korean public about multicultural families living in Korea.
Insooni sang the theme song for the PyeongChang 2018 Olympic Torch Relay, "Let Everyone Shine".

Ceremony
The ceremony's message centered on peace, passion, harmony, and convergence.

Five children from rural Gangwon province led the ceremony, which included one Inmyeonjo (a mythical creature with a body of a bird and a head of a human, a creature that only appears when the world is at peace), four mythical creatures, including a white tiger – spirit animal protector of Korea and the mascot of these Games, natural floral and fauna, and a cast of 2,000. Five children were used to symbolize the five Olympic rings, and the five names were chosen to represent fire, water, wood, metal, and earth, the five elements that are believed to make up the Earth.

Augmented reality and 5G technology were also incorporated in the event. The largest drone show in history, featuring 1,218 Shooting Star drones, was planned for the ceremony but cancelled at the last minute; television audiences were shown a version that had been recorded the previous December.

During the opening ceremony the organizing committee was a victim of a cyber attack, but without major consequences.

Programme

Parade of Nations

The Parade of Nations was led, according to custom due to hosting the original ancient Olympics, by the Greek team, followed by other competing countries in alphabetical order based on their names in the Korean language, with the host country, South Korea, concluding the march.

The delegations from both the host nation South Korea and North Korea (Korea at the 2018 Winter Olympics) marched under the Korean unification flag. South Korean Won Yun-jong and North Korean Hwang Chung-gum both held the flagpole.

Even though the temperature in the stadium during the ceremony was very cold, Bermuda's delegation wore shorts and Tongan Pita Taufatofua repeated his shirtless and oiled up Summer Olympic appearance.

Background music for the parade began with an instrumental version of "Hand in Hand" by Koreana and included modern remixes of Korean songs from throughout the ages from "Short Hair" by Cho Yong-pil and "The Beauty" by Shin Jung Hyun & Yup Juns of the 1970s, as well as the following modern K-pop hits:  "Gangnam Style" by Psy, "Likey" by Twice, "Fantastic Baby" by Big Bang, "DNA" by BTS, and "Red Flavor" by Red Velvet. "Red Flavor" was cut off just as the unified Korean team was introduced.

Opening Speeches and Proclamation of opening the Pyeongchang 2018 Olympics

Lee Hee-beom, President & CEO of the PyeongChang Organizing Committee for the 2018 Olympic & Paralympic Winter Games make an opening welcome speech to the athletes of the world in Korean. Followed by Thomas Bach, IOC President who will make an address. President Bach is inviting the President of the Republic of Korea Moon Jae-in to declare open the XXIII Olympic Winter Games in PyeongChang in Korean.

Torch lighting

The Olympic flame was on a 101-day relay across South Korea. The start of the ceremony takes place in Olympia of Greece. Apostles Angelis, 24 years old cross-country skier, was selected to be the relay originating torchbearer. He said "It is a great honour for me to be chosen as the first torchbearer for the Olympic Winter Games of 2018. It is truly a unique moment that I am looking forward to. I feel very proud and with a unique sense of happiness." Inbee Park, the golfer from Republic of Korea, was the second person to hold the torch. After the flame touring around Greece for a week, it reached the Acropolis on 30 October. There were 36 ceremonies held in different cities over a week, then the flame arrived to the PyeongChang Panathenaic Stadium. More than 500 torchbearers participated to follow the rituals of Olympic cycle, and carried the message of peace. In the stadium, Opera soloist Sumi Hwang sang the Olympic anthem during the torch lighting ceremony. The final person to hold the torch was Ahn Jung-hwan, football player in Republic of Korea. Jong Su-hyon from North Korea and Park Jong-ah from South Korea carried the torch and headed up stairs toward the cauldron. As the torch neared the cauldron, an ice skating rink with South Korean figure skater Yuna Kim was revealed. Yuna Kim is the well-known figure skater who won gold medal in 2010 and silver medal in 2014. The cauldron was designed to represent a full moon when it is not lit. Kim received the torch and lit the cauldron.

Wish Fire

The final segment entitled "Wish Fire" featured Korean dance group Just Jerk (who became known internationally for their participation in the twelfth season of America's Got Talent) entered the stage dressed as Dokkaebi, and performers with sparklers on roller blades.

Intel Drone Light Show 
More than 1,200 Intel Unmanned Aerial Vehicles (UAVs) or drones flying above PyeongChang to celebrate the opening of 2018 Winter Olympic Games. Intel drone team now holds the Guinness World Record of flying largest number of drones. The drones flew together to form custom animations illustrating snow boarding, skiing, other different sports, as well as the iconic Olympic rings. The Shooting Star drones carried on the symbol of unity and progress from lighting of the torch.

Hacking of computer systems
On 24 February, The Washington Post reported that U.S. intelligence uncovered Russian spies hacked computers during the Opening Ceremony. Analysts believed the Russians instigated the 9 February attack as a way to retaliate for the International Olympic Committee's decision to restrict the participation of Russian athletes in the 2018 Winter Olympics as punishment for doping violations.

Sandworm, a Russian cybermilitary unit of the GRU, is believed to be responsible for the attack. The worm used is known as "Olympic Destroyer". It targeted all Olympic IT infrastructure, and succeeded in taking down WiFi, feeds to jumbotrons, ticketing systems, and other Olympic systems. It was timed to go off at the start of the opening ceremonies. It was unique in that the hackers attempted to use many false signatures to blame other countries such as North Korea and China.

Dignitaries in attendance

About 25 heads of state attended the ceremony, in addition to the UN Secretary General. President of Russia Vladimir Putin was invited to attend, but declined due to the symbolic ban on Russia by the IOC.

  Canada - Governor General Julie Payette
  China - Politburo standing member and Vice Premier Han Zheng
  Colombia - Vice President Óscar Naranjo
  Denmark - Crown Prince Frederik (representing the Queen of Denmark)
  Estonia - President Kersti Kaljulaid
  Finland - Prime Minister Juha Sipilä
  France - President Emmanuel Macron, Minister of Europe and Foreign Affairs Jean-Yves Le Drian and Minister of Sports Laura Flessel
  Germany - President Frank-Walter Steinmeier
  Italy - Sports Minister of Italy Luca Lotti
  Japan - Prime Minister Shinzo Abe
  Kosovo - President Hashim Thaçi
  Latvia - President Andris Berzins
  Lithuania - President Dalia Grybauskaitė
  Luxembourg - Grand Duke Henri
  Malaysia - Prime Minister Najib Razak
  Monaco - Prince Albert II
  Netherlands - King Willem Alexander, Queen Máxima and Prime Minister Mark Rutte
  Norway - Prime Minister Erna Solberg
  North Korea - President of the Presidium of the Supreme People's Assembly Kim Yong-nam and Vice Director of the Propaganda and Agitation Department of the Workers' Party of Korea Kim Yo-jong
  Poland - President Andrzej Duda
  Serbia - Minister of Youth and Sports Vanja Udovičić
  South Korea - President of the Republic of Korea Moon Jae-in, First Lady of the Republic of Korea Kim Jung-sook, President & CEO of the PyeongChang Organizing Committee for the 2018 Olympic & Paralympic Winter Games Lee Hee-beom and Former President Lee Myung-bak
  Slovakia - President Andrej Kiska
  Slovenia - President Borut Pahor
  Sweden - King Carl XVI Gustaf and Queen Silvia
  Switzerland - President Alain Berset
  Great Britain - Princess Royal Anne
  United States - Vice President Mike Pence and Second Lady Karen Pence
  United Nations - Secretary-General António Guterres and Former Secretary-General Ban Ki-moon
  Vatican City - Under-secretary of Pontifical Council for Culture Melchor Sanchez de Toca
  International Olympic Committee - President Thomas Bach

On 9 February 2018, Kim Yo-jong—sister of Kim Jong-un—attended the ceremony in Pyeongchang, South Korea. This was a first time that a member of the ruling Kim dynasty had visited South Korea since the Korean War. Kim Yo-jong shook hands with South Korean president Moon Jae-in before sitting down to watch the ceremony together.

Anthems
 Rainbow Children's Choir – South Korean National Anthem
 Sumi Hwang – Olympic Hymn

Ceremony key team
Artistic Director: Yang Jung-woong
Executive Director, creative: Song Seung-whan
Executive Director, cinematography: Lim Tae-hong, Andrew

References

External links
 
 Pyeongchang 2018 Olympic Games Opening Ceremony Media Guide (as found on Olympic Library) 
 Thomas Bach, President of the International Olympic Committee's speech

Opening Ceremony
Ceremonies in South Korea
Olympics opening ceremonies